Waldstadion an der Kaiserlinde is a multi-use stadium in Spiesen-Elversberg, Germany.  It is currently used mostly for football matches and is the home stadium of SV Elversberg. The stadium is able to hold 9,970 people.

References

SV Elversberg
Football venues in Germany
Buildings and structures in Neunkirchen (German district)
Sports venues in Saarland